The  was the third imperially commissioned anthology of kanshi (poetry written in classical Chinese by Japanese poets). The text was compiled by Yoshimine no Yasuyo, Minabuchi no Hirosada, Sugawara no Kiyotomo, Yasuno no Fumitugu, Shigeno no Sadanushi, and Abe no Yoshihito under the command of Emperor Junna. The text was completed in 827, 13 years after the previous imperial collection, Bunka Shūreishū.

Contents 

The text is twenty volumes in length. However, only six of those still remain: 1, 10, 11, 13, 14, and 20. It contains material spanning 120 years from 707 to 827 with contributions from 178 authors. In addition to 917 poems, it also contains 17 fu and 38 civil promotion tests.

References 
 
 

Late Old Japanese texts
Heian period in literature
Japanese poetry collections
Kanshi (poetry)
9th-century Japanese books